Dhyanimani is an Indian Marathi language film directed by Chandrakant Kulkarni. The film stars Mahesh Manjrekar, Ashwini Bhave, Abhijeet Khandkekar and Mrunmayee Deshpande. Music by Ajit Parab. The film was released on 10 February 2017.

Synopsis 
Parents-to-be Samir and Aparna go on a weekend trip to visit Sada, Shalini and their son Mohit. However, their stay turns eerie when they unveil a dark secret about the happy family.

Cast 
 Mahesh Manjrekar as Sadanand Pathak 
 Ashwini Bhave as Shalini Pathak 
 Abhijeet Khandkekar as Sameer Karandikar 
 Mrunmayee Deshpande as Aparna
 Madhav Abhyankar as Karandikar Sir and Samir's father

Soundtrack

Critical reception 
Dhyanimani received Positive reviews from critics. Santosh Bhingarde of Sakal wrote "The period in which the play was set may have left it as it was. Yet gripping till the end, this psychological thriller is definitely worth watching". Reshma Raikwar of Loksatta says "'Dhyanimani', which conveys a different dramatic subject through the film, will be a different experience for the audience". Blessy Chettiar of Cinestaan.com wrote "All said and done, it’s good to see a Marathi film in this genre. Watch it for the top-class performances by Bhave and Manjrekar". Ganesh Matkari of Pune Mirror wrote "It’s a wonder how the film manages to deliver an improbable, but marginally acceptable climax, but it does. Considering the rest of the film, it’s a great achievement". A Reviewer of Maharashtra Times wrote "'Dhyanimani' is a movie with deep social content. This movie really comments on what can happen to a childless couple due to traditional social beliefs".

References

External links
 
 

2017 films
2010s Marathi-language films
Indian drama films